Step Into Light is the sixth studio album by American rock band Fastball and called "the must have album of the summer [of 2017]." Their first album since 2009, it was released in 2017. The album was recorded over a two-week period. The album was produced by the band, Chris "Frenchie" Smith, and mixed by Bob Clearmountain.

Recording history 
Some songs appearing on the album were written in the years between Fastball albums. A version of "Secret Agent Love" was produced by Adam Schlesinger, but was re-recorded for the album. Initial recording sessions started in February 2015 at the Bubble in Austin, Texas.

"Love Comes in Waves" was recorded and issued as a single in 2015.

Track listing
"We're on Our Way" (Kevin Lovejoy, Miles Zuniga) – 2:44
"Best Friend" (Zuniga, Tony Scalzo) – 3:21
"Behind the Sun" (Zuniga) – 2:03
"I Will Never Let You Down" (Scalzo) – 2:38
"Love Comes in Waves" (Zuniga) – 2:51
"Step Into Light" (Zuniga) – 2:16
"Just Another Dream" (Scalzo) – 2:57
"Tanzania" (Zuniga) – 1:56
"Secret Agent Love (Scalzo) – 2:46
"Hung Up" (Zuniga) – 2:28
"Don't Give Up On Me" (Zuniga, Scalzo) – 2:19
"Frenchy and the Punk" (Zuniga) – 2:31

Personnel
Fastball
 Tony Scalzo - vocals, bass guitar, keyboards, guitar
 Miles Zuniga - vocals, guitar
 Joey Shuffield  - drums, percussion

References

2017 albums
Fastball (band) albums